Elijah Allen Cox or Allen Cox (February 16, 1887 – August 28, 1974) was a United States district judge of the United States District Court for the Northern District of Mississippi.

Education and career
Cox was born in Baldwyn, Mississippi. He attended McTyeire School in McKenzie, Tennessee and received a Bachelor of Arts degree from Vanderbilt University in 1909. He read law in 1911 to enter the bar. He was in private practice in Baldwyn from 1911 to 1924, interrupted by service in the United States Army during World War I. In the summer of 1917, he went to Officer Training Camp at Fort Logan H. Roots, Arkansas. He was a Chancellor of the First Chancery Court of Mississippi from 1924 to 1929.

Federal judicial service
On March 1, 1929, Cox was nominated by President Calvin Coolidge to a new seat on the United States District Court for the Northern District of Mississippi created by 45 Stat. 1422. He was confirmed by the United States Senate on March 2, 1929, and received his commission the same day. He assumed senior status on March 22, 1957, and served in that capacity until his death on August 28, 1974.

Later life
He was buried at Baldwyn Masonic Cemetery, Baldwyn, Mississippi.

References

Sources

1887 births
1974 deaths
20th-century American judges
Mississippi state court judges
Judges of the United States District Court for the Northern District of Mississippi
United States district court judges appointed by Calvin Coolidge
United States Army officer trainees
United States federal judges admitted to the practice of law by reading law
People from Baldwyn, Mississippi
Vanderbilt University alumni